Mary Elizabeth "Beth" Phillips (born 1969) is the Chief United States district judge of the United States District Court for the Western District of Missouri.

Early life and education
Phillips was born in Kirksville, Missouri in 1969. She received two degrees from the University of Chicago, a Bachelor of Arts in 1991 and a Master of Arts in 1992. Phillips then earned her Juris Doctor from the University of Missouri School of Law in 1996.

U.S. Attorney
On September 30, 2009, President Barack Obama nominated Phillips to serve as the United States Attorney for the Western District of Missouri. She was confirmed by the United States Senate on December 24, 2009.

Federal judicial service
On June 7, 2011, President Barack Obama nominated Phillips to a seat on United States District Court for the Western District of Missouri. She would replace Judge Ortrie D. Smith, who assumed senior status in 2011. She received a hearing before the Senate Judiciary Committee on September 20, 2011, and her nomination was reported to the floor of the Senate by a voice vote on October 13, 2011. On March 6, 2012, the United States Senate confirmed Phillips' nomination by a 95–2 vote. She received her commission on March 22, 2012. She was sworn in on March 23, 2012. She became Chief Judge on January 3, 2019.

References

External links

1969 births
Living people
Judges of the United States District Court for the Western District of Missouri
People from Kirksville, Missouri
United States Attorneys for the Western District of Missouri
United States district court judges appointed by Barack Obama
21st-century American judges
University of Chicago alumni
University of Missouri School of Law alumni
Assistant United States Attorneys
21st-century American women judges